Rånäs is a locality situated in Norrtälje Municipality, Stockholm County, Sweden. It had 428 inhabitants in 2010.

References 

Populated places in Norrtälje Municipality